Ben Hammond (born 1977) is an American sculptor and painter. His sculpture of Martha Hughes Cannon will represent Utah in the National Statuary Hall Collection in the United States Capitol. The 7 foot, 6 inch statue of Cannon will be molded from bronze and will replace a statue of Philo T. Farnsworth.

Hammond studied art at Ricks College graduating with a degree in Illustration. Since 2007 Hammond has completed portrait busts for the Pro Football Hall of Fame including Jason Taylor and Champ Bailey. He created five large sculptures for the Healing Gardens of the Methodist Women's Hospital in Omaha, Nebraska.

In 2015, he received the Gloria Medal and the Beverly Hoyt Robertson Memorial Award. He received the Charlotte Geffken prize in 2010 and 2011 from The National Competition for Figurative Sculpture. He is a three-time winner of the Dexter Jones Award for his work in bas-relief from the National Sculpture Society. Hammond lives in American Fork, Utah and is a member of the Church of Jesus Christ of Latter-day Saints.

References

External links
 Ben Hammond Official website

Living people
1977 births
21st-century American sculptors
21st-century American male artists
Latter Day Saints from Utah
Sculptors from Utah
Latter Day Saint artists
American Latter Day Saint artists